Lokovica is a settlement in the Municipality of Šoštanj in northern Slovenia. It lies in the hills south of the town of Šoštanj. The area is part of the traditional region of Styria. The municipality is now included in the Savinja Statistical Region.

References

External links
Lokovica at Geopedia

Populated places in the Municipality of Šoštanj